Romeo Menti (5 September 1919 – 4 May 1949) was an Italian footballer who played as a forward. He scored 145 goals in a career that spanned fifteen years.

Career
Born in Vicenza, Menti debuted for his hometown's Serie C club in 1935, in the same stadium that was to be dedicated to him a few years later.

His older brothers Mario Menti and Umberto Menti and nephew Luigi Menti (son of Mario) all played football professionally, with Umberto playing for Juventus F.C., S.S.C. Napoli and A.C. Milan. To distinguish them, Mario was known as Menti I, Umberto as Menti II, Romeo as Menti III, and Luigi as Menti IV. In some sources, Mario was ignored and Umberto and Romeo were listed as Menti I and Menti II respectively.

In 1938 he was sold to Fiorentina, where he played for three seasons before moving to Torino F.C. His abilities became evident also with national team, for which he received 5 caps with 7 goals.

Menti played for the then almost unbeatable Torino (dubbed Grande Torino, "Great Torino") until his death, with the exception of the 1945–46 season, when he played again for Fiorentina. Menti died in 1949 with almost his entire team in the Superga air disaster, after scoring the last goal of "Grande Torino" in Lisboa.

Honours

Club
Fiorentina
Serie B: 1938–39
Coppa Italia: 1939–40
Torino
Serie A: 1942–43, 1946–47, 1947–48, 1948–49
Coppa Italia: 1942–43

References

Italy international footballers
L.R. Vicenza players
Juventus F.C. players
A.C. Milan players
S.S.C. Napoli players
ACF Fiorentina players
Torino F.C. players
S.S. Juve Stabia players
Serie A players
Serie B players
Sportspeople from Vicenza
1919 births
1949 deaths
Association football forwards
Footballers killed in the Superga air disaster
Footballers from Veneto
Italian footballers